Na Beregu Neba is an album by Dima Bilan released in July 2004.

Track listing
Ты Должна Рядом Быть
Мулатка
На Берегу Неба
Милая
Листья Праздничных Клёнов
Только Ты Не Плачь
Как Ромео
Невеста
Всё Равно Найду
Ночь Без Тебя
В Западне
Вода, Песок
Петербуржская Весна
Поздрaвляю!
Как Хотел Я

In 2005, the reissue of the album came out, which included English versions of 3 songs. From the English version of the song "Ты Должна Рядом Быть" Dima took part in the national preselection for the Eurovision Song Contest in 2005, where he took 2nd place.

Bonus on Special Edition
 Between The Sky And Heaven
 Not That Simple
 Take Me With You

2004 albums
Albums produced by Yuri Aizenshpis
Dima Bilan albums